The 2020 Fort Lauderdale CF season is the inaugural season in the soccer team's history, where they compete in the third division of American soccer, USL League One. Fort Lauderdale CF, as a child club of Inter Miami CF of Major League Soccer, are barred from participating in the 2020 U.S. Open Cup. Fort Lauderdale CF play their home games at Inter Miami CF Stadium, located in Fort Lauderdale, Florida, United States.

Club

Roster 
As of February 25, 2020.

Coaching staff

Front Office Staff

Competitions

USL League One

Standings

Results summary

Results by round

Match results

See also
 2020 Inter Miami CF season

References

Inter Miami CF II
Fort Lauderdale
Fort Lauderdale
Fort Lauderdale